Ibrahima Mame N'Diaye (born 6 December 1994) is a Senegalese professional footballer who plays as a forward for Serbian club Čukarički.

Club career
Born in Dakar, N'Diaye played for ASC Linguère in his homeland, before moving abroad to Serbia and joining Napredak Kruševac in late 2012. He made his first-team debut in the second half of the 2012–13 Serbian First League, helping them win the title and promotion to the top flight. Over the next two seasons, N'Diaye scored nine goals in the Serbian SuperLiga, before the club suffered relegation. He subsequently scored 10 goals in the 2015–16 Serbian First League, helping them to a first-place finish and promotion back to the top flight. In the summer of 2017, N'Diaye left the club after his contract expired.

On 7 August 2017, N'Diaye officially joined Danish club Randers on a five-month contract. He made seven competitive appearances for the side, scoring one goal in the Danish Cup.

In early 2018, N'Diaye returned to Serbia and his former club Napredak Kruševac.

On 21 January 2021, he joined Sudanese club Al-Hilal, and made 2 appearances for the club in the CAF Cup.

International career
N'Diaye represented Senegal at the 2011 African U-17 Championship, making three appearances and scoring one goal in a 2–1 loss to Egypt, as the team exited in the group stage.

Statistics

Honours
Napredak Kruševac
 Serbian First League: 2012–13, 2015–16

References

External links
 
 

ASC Linguère players
Association football forwards
Danish Superliga players
Expatriate men's footballers in Denmark
Expatriate footballers in Serbia
FK Napredak Kruševac players
Randers FC players
FK Čukarički players
Senegal Premier League players
Senegal youth international footballers
Senegalese expatriate footballers
Senegalese expatriate sportspeople in Denmark
Senegalese expatriate sportspeople in Serbia
Senegalese footballers
Serbian First League players
Serbian SuperLiga players
Footballers from Dakar
1994 births
Living people